Samuel, Sam or Sammy Taylor (male first name) may refer to:

Arts
 Sam Taylor (director) (1895–1958), American film director and screenwriter
 Samuel W. Taylor (1907–1997), American author
 Samuel A. Taylor (1912–2000), playwright and screenwriter
 Sam Taylor (saxophonist) (1916–1990), jazz and blues player
 Sam Taylor (blues musician) (1934–2009), American musician
 Samuel Jared Taylor (born 1951), American journalist 
 Sam Taylor (producer) (born c.1953), American rock music producer
 Sam Taylor (author) (born 1970), British author

Politics
 Samuel Taylor (Virginia politician) (1781–1853), American politician and lawyer from Virginia
 Samuel M. Taylor (1852–1921), American politician from the state of Arkansas
 Samuel McIntire Taylor (1856–1916), Republican politician in Ohio

Sports
 Samuel Taylor (American football), American football coach
 Sam Taylor (English footballer) (1893–1973), English footballer
 Sam B. Taylor (1898–1966), American baseball player and football coach
 Samuel "Bay" Taylor (1929–2019), Negro league baseball player
 Sammy Taylor (footballer, born 1933) (1933–2013), Scottish footballer
 Sammy Taylor (baseball) (1933–2019), American baseball catcher
 Sam Taylor (Australian footballer) (born 1999), Australian rules footballer
 Samuel Taylor (footballer, born 2003), English footballer

Other
 Samuel Taylor (stenographer) (1748/9–1811), invented widely used shorthand system
 Samuel Penfield Taylor (1827–1886), American entrepreneur
 Samuel Taylor (bishop) (1859–1929), Bishop of Kingston in the Church of England
 Samuel Harvey Taylor (1807–1871), American educator
 Sam Taylor (Family Affairs), a fictional character on the UK soap opera Family Affairs

See also
 Samantha Taylor (disambiguation)
 Sam Taylor-Wood (born 1967), British filmmaker
 Samuel Taylor Coleridge (1772–1834), British poet
 Samuel Taylor Suit (1830–1888), Maryland politician and landowner
 Samuel Coleridge-Taylor (1875–1912), British composer